There were a number of games available for the monochrome Kaypro computers. There are currently 10 games on this list.

Models II, IV, 4, 10 and 2x 
Aliens
Adventure
CatChum
Horse Race
Ladder
Star Trek
Star Lanes
Trivia+Plus
Trivia+Plus Baseball Edition
 Wumpus, a version of Hunt the Wumpus

External links

Kaypro games
!